Ringdansen (the Circle dance) is a suburb in the very South of the Swedish city of Norrköping. It is well known for its typical circular houses, inner passages and park areas inside the two blocks. There are two circular blocks called "ringar" (rings) in Swedish: Guldringen (the Golden Ring) in the North, and Silverringen (the Silver Ring) in the South. Originally, two more rings were intended: Järnringen (the Iron Ring) to the South och Silverringen and Kopparringen (the Copper Ring) in the very South. Ringdansen is situated in the larger district of Navestad, with Atrium to the North and Kvarnberget to the South.

The Norrköping tramway system was extended to Ringdansen in 2011. The extension has a length of 4,1 km and is connected to the previous system at the Albrektsvägen/Trozelligatan streets intersection. From there, the line runs to the North of Albrektsvägen, turns 90 degrees to the right near Ljuragatan, continues straight to the south over the Ljura fields, crosses the Söderleden via a new bridge, passes through the North-Western areas of Hageby suburb, serves the Hageby Mall, runs through the Southern parts of Hageby, passes the Navestad Atrium and finally stops in the centre of the Ringdansen area.

Norrköping